Leo van Veen (born 6 June 1946) is a Dutch former footballer who played as a forward or defender. During his career he played for FC Utrecht, Los Angeles Aztecs, Ajax Amsterdam and RKC Waalwijk, making 555 appearances in the Eredivisie and scoring 174 goals. Later on he became a football manager.

References
 
 Profile
 NEC Profile

1946 births
Living people
Footballers from Utrecht (city)
Association football forwards
Association football defenders
Dutch footballers
Dutch football managers
FC Utrecht players
AFC Ajax players
RKC Waalwijk players
Eredivisie players
Los Angeles Aztecs players
North American Soccer League (1968–1984) players
Dutch expatriate footballers
Expatriate soccer players in the United States
Eredivisie managers
RKC Waalwijk managers
VVV-Venlo managers
FC Utrecht managers
Go Ahead Eagles managers
Ajax Cape Town F.C. managers
Dutch expatriate football managers
Expatriate soccer managers in South Africa
Dutch expatriate sportspeople in South Africa